= Leonaedoeus concolor =

Scientific classification
- Kingdom: Animalia
- Phylum: Arthropoda
- Class: Insecta
- Order: Coleoptera
- Suborder: Polyphaga
- Infraorder: Cucujiformia
- Family: Cerambycidae
- Genus: Leonaedoeus
- Species: L. concolor

Binomial name
- Leonaedoeus concolor (Fairmaire, 1897)

Synonyms
- Aedoeus concolor

Species of beetle

Leonaedoeus concolor is a species of beetle in the family Cerambycidae. It was described by Fairmaire in 1897.
